James U. Goodman (May 11, 1872 – June 7, 1953) was an American farmer, teacher, businessman and politician. 

Goodman was born in Jo Daviess County, Illinois and went to public schools. He taught in schools and was a farmer. Goodman was in the real estate business and was an auctioneer. Goodman was also President of the Argyle Equity Shipping Association. Goodman served as chairman, clerk, and supervisor for the town of Lamont, Lafayette County, Wisconsin. He also served as chairman of the Argyle Town Board in Lafayette County. Goodman served in the Wisconsin State Assembly from 1921 to 1927 and was a Republican. Goodman died at St. Clare Hospital in Monroe, Wisconsin after a short illness.

Notes

External links

1872 births
1953 deaths
People from Jo Daviess County, Illinois
People from Argyle, Wisconsin
Businesspeople from Wisconsin
Educators from Wisconsin
Farmers from Wisconsin
Mayors of places in Wisconsin
Wisconsin city council members
Educators from Illinois
Republican Party members of the Wisconsin State Assembly